is a song by Japanese rock band Asian Kung-Fu Generation. It was released on September 26, 2018 and reached number 18 on the Oricon. "Boys & Girls" features lyrics described as cheering on all people of today’s generation which thread through a mid-tempo number characterised by powerful and surging guitar riffs. B-side single, "Shukujitsu" was composed by bassist,  Takahiro Yamada.

Music video
The music video for "Boys & Girls" was directed by Masaki Ōkita. The video features boys and girls spent their time with joyful and smile. The video ends with Gotoh said something like "Ganbatte" (do your best) to the camera.

Track listing

Charts

Release history

References

Asian Kung-Fu Generation songs
2018 singles
Songs written by Masafumi Gotoh
2018 songs
Ki/oon Music singles